An Bình may refer to several places in Vietnam, including:

An Bình, Biên Hòa, a ward of Biên Hòa
An Bình, Dĩ An, a ward of Dĩ An
An Bình, An Giang, a rural commune of Thoại Sơn District in An Giang Province